Sarteneja Airport  is an airport serving Sarteneja, a town in the Corozal District in northern Belize. The airport is just east of the town, which is on Chetumal Bay.

Airlines and destinations

See also

List of airports in Belize
Transport in Belize

References

External links
WAC - Sarteneja Airport
OurAirports - Sarteneja Airport

Airports in Belize
Corozal District